5-Methylethylone (5-methyl-βk-MDEA, 5ME) is an empathogen, stimulant and psychedelic drug of the amphetamine, phenethylamine, and cathinone chemical classes.  It is structurally related to ethylone, a novel designer drug. Relatively little data exists about the pharmacological properties, metabolism, and toxicity of 5-methylethylone, though it has been sold as a designer drug.

Legal status

United States
5-Methylethylone is unscheduled in the United States, but it is not currently approved by the Food and Drug Administration for human consumption. The state of Vermont lists it as a regulated drug.

See also
 5-Methyl-MDA
 Butylone
 Eutylone
 Ephylone
 Isohexylone
 Methylone
 N-Ethylhexylone

References

Cathinones
Benzodioxoles
Designer drugs
Serotonin-norepinephrine-dopamine releasing agents
Substituted amphetamines